Didier Motchane (17 September 1931 – 29 October 2017) was a French politician who served as a member of the European Parliament from 1979 to 1989.

He was born in Paris on 17 September 1931 to mathematician Léon Motchane. Didier Motchane later married actress and film director Dominique Cabrera.

He is often credited with the fist and rose design used by socialist political organizations worldwide, which he claimed to have “invented” in his 2010 memoirs, but the initiative is disputed between other party leaders of the time.

He was a member of the European Parliament from 1979 to 1989, representing the Socialist Party. He left the party in 1993 after a disagreement with François Mitterrand, and helped establish the Citizen and Republican Movement.

Motchane died of cancer at the age of 86 on 29 October, 2017.

References

1931 births
2017 deaths
Politicians from Paris
MEPs for France 1979–1984
MEPs for France 1984–1989
Socialist Party (France) MEPs
Citizen and Republican Movement politicians
Deaths from cancer in France
French people of Swiss descent
French people of Russian-Jewish descent